Schlegel is a German occupational surname. Notable people with the surname include:

 Anthony Schlegel (born 1981), former American football linebacker
 August Wilhelm Schlegel (1767–1845), German poet, older brother of Friedrich
 Brad Schlegel (born 1968), Canadian ice hockey player
 Bernhard Schlegel (born 1951), German-Canadian chemist and professor at Wayne State University
 Carmela Schlegel (born 1983), retired Swiss swimmer
 Catharina von Schlegel (1697 – after 1768), German hymn writer
 Dorothea von Schlegel (1764–1839), German novelist and translator, wife of Friedrich Schlegel
 Elfi Schlegel (born 1964), former Canadian gymnast and sportscaster for NBC Sports
 Frits Schlegel (1896–1965), Danish architect
 Gustaaf Schlegel (1840–1903), Dutch sinologist and field naturalist
 Hans Schlegel (born 1951), German astronaut
 Helmut Schlegel (born 1943), German Franciscan, priest, author, meditation instructor, songwriter
 Hermann Schlegel (1804–1884), German ornithologist and herpetologist
 Johan Frederik Schlegel (1817–1896), Danish civil servant and Governor-General of the Danish West Indies
 Johann Adolf Schlegel (1721–1793), German poet and clergyman, father of August Wilhelm and Friedrich
 Johann Elias Schlegel (1719–1749), German critic and dramatic poet, brother of Johann Adolf
 John P. Schlegel (born 1943), President of Creighton University and Jesuit
 Karl Wilhelm Friedrich Schlegel (1772–1829), German poet and philosopher, younger brother of August Wilhelm, known as Friedrich.
 Karl Schlegel (aviator) (1893–1918), German World War I flying ace
 Lynda Schlegel-Culver, Republican politician from Pennsylvania
 Margarete Schlegel (1899–1987), German actress
 Marvin Schlegel, German athlete
 Norbert Schlegel (born 1961), German former footballer and coach
 Paul Marquard Schlegel 1605–1653), German anatomist
 Richard Schlegel, American scientist and professor, chair of the department of pathology at Georgetown University
 Victor Schlegel (1843–1905), German mathematician

See also

German-language surnames
Occupational surnames